Potitus Valerius Messalla (c. 70 BC – after 17 BC) was an Ancient Roman statesman, probably a son of Marcus Valerius Messalla Rufus. He presumably had two sons: Manius Valerius Messalla Potitus and Lucius Valerius Messalla Volesus. In 17 BC, Messalla participated in the Secular games.

References
, 

OGIS 460
Dio Cassius LI 21

Further reading
A. E. Gordon, "Potitus Valerius Messalla Consul Suffect 29 B.C." University of California Publications in Classical Archaeology, 1954, vol. 3, no. 2, pp. 31–64.

70s BC births
1st-century BC deaths
1st-century BC Romans
Roman governors of Asia
Roman legates
Roman quaestors
Roman Republican praetors
Suffect consuls of Imperial Rome
Potitus
Year of death uncertain